Thomas Hugh Clifford, 14th Baron Clifford of Chudleigh,  (born 17 March 1948), is a British hereditary peer and former British Army officer.

Background 
He is the first son of the late Colonel The Right Hon. Lewis Hugh Clifford, 13th Baron Clifford of Chudleigh, and The Honourable Katharine Vavasseur Fisher. Through his mother he is a great-grandson of Admiral of the Fleet John Fisher, 1st Baron Fisher.

He was educated at Downside School. He was appointed a Deputy Lieutenant of Devon in 1998.

Succession
On his father's death in 1988 he succeeded him as Baron Clifford of Chudleigh.

Marriages and issue
He has married twice.

First: to Suzanne Austin on 15 December 1980. A daughter and two sons:
The Hon. Georgina Apollonia Clifford.
The Hon. Alexander Thomas Hugh Clifford.
The Hon. Edward George Clifford.
This marriage ended by process of divorce in 1992.

Second: to Clarissa Goodall on 21 November 1994. No children.

He is the Honorary Colonel of the Royal Devon Yeomanry and is also the Deputy President of Devon Scout County, part of The Scout Association.

Alexander Clifford appeared on the U.S. reality show Filthy Rich: Cattle Drive.

References

External links
thePeerage.com

the royal GEDCOM Data Base

1948 births
Living people
People educated at Downside School
Deputy Lieutenants of Devon
Knights of Malta
14

Clifford of Chudleigh